The Ngorora Formation is a geological formation in Kenya preserving fossils dating to the Miocene. The uppermost member of the formation shows sign of a faunal turnover that occurred around 11 to 10.5 million years ago, coinciding with faunal changes elsewhere in the world. This turnover includes the arrival of the horse Hipparion in East Africa. The Ngorora Formation was initially mapped by G.R. Chapman in collaboration with the  East African Geological Research Unit (EAGRU) and formally described by Bishop & Chapman in 1970. Major fossil finds were made in the early 1970s, with expeditions to the area recovering thousands of mammal, fish and mollusc remains alongside less common fossil material of birds and reptiles.

Geography
The formation is bordered to the west by the Elgeyo Escarpment, the east by the Laikipia Plateau and to the north by the Tiati volcanic center. To the south the formation is limited by the rising floor of the rift. During its deposition the formation contained two prominent upland areas, the topographic high of the Saimo Horst and Sidekh towards the north east, separated from the Saimo Horst by 8 km of lowland. The formation is roughly separated into four areas. Area I, the Kabarsero Type Area, split into Area Ia and Area Ib by the Kito Pass Fault; Area II west of the Cherial Fault, which includes the Tugen Hills, Kapkiamu Graben and Kaption Volcanic Complex; and Area III just south of the Saimo Horst.

Geology and Stratigraphy
The basin the Ngorora Formation was deposited in is floored by the rocks of the underlying Tiim Formation and has seen repeated tectonic and volcanic activity around and during its deposition.
Member A
Member A is a thick layer that consists of volcaniclastic material and clay in Area I of the region. The coarse volcanic sediments likely originated from the possibly reached this part of the formation in the form of lahars originating from the Kaption Volcanic Complex to the south-west.
Member B
Member B shows a mix of gritty tuff beds, clay and silt. The lapilli tuff in Area I possibly correlates with similar lithology of Area II and on the upthrow of the Kito Pass Fault the layers of clay and silt found in the type area of the Member are absent, leaving sandy and gritty layers of tuff to lie directly over one another.
Member C
The layers of Member C are closely overlying each other and consist of clay and shale with some sand in Area Ia, while in Area Ib slight erosion and channeling can be observed. The shale originated almost entirely through chemical precipitation while the clay likely originated through the erosion of the underlying Tiim Formation.
Member D
Member D shows a mix of clay layers cross-bedded with gritty and silty tuffs. Slumps, fissures and faults indicate increased tectonic activity affecting the area during its time of deposition. Area III preserves a mix of red marbled earth and silt which may be equivalent to Member D. Following major faulting at Cheprimok, 130 meters of sediment of this member eroded in the Ngorora Formation, causing Member E to rest unconformably atop of Member A and even overstepping onto the Tiim Formation. This faulting event was widespread and even affected Area II 20 kilometers away. 
Member E
Another faulting event preceded the deposition of Member E, marking the return of lacustrine conditions as evident by kieselgur (sediments originating from algae) and fish-bearing shales. However tectonic uplift of the Kito Pass and Saimo Faults caused much of the record of this member to be lost to erosion.

During the deposition of the Ngorora Formation the area shows several signs of volcanic activity. The Kaption volcano in Area II is likely responsible for much of the lahar and tuff found in Area I. The Laikipia Area and Tiati volcanic center likewise contributed to the volcanic material of the formation.

Paleoenvironment
The Ngorora Formation shows a great variety of environments and conditions throughout its stratigraphy. Mudcracks, Caliche, plant remains, bird footprints, channeling, signs of evaporation as well as various algae-based sediments all show signs of varying dry and wet conditions during the Miocene.

Member A preserves the bones of proboscideans and rhinos as well as the remains of reptiles and fish and represents an originally lacustrine environment with minor fluvial elements, all affected by lahas and other volcanic activity.

During the deposition of Member B Kaption Volcano was still active at irregular intervals. Member B shows signs of channeling caused by flowing water and flourishing plant growth (evidenced by root casts). At Kalimale weathering and plant growth were so extreme that all of the lapilli in a 45 cm thick layer was destroyed. The fauna of the member is of little use however, as the presence of channels means that animal material was likely derived from various localities over a great distance. Ruminant remains however have been used to derive an open or lightly wooded grassland habitat.

After increased volcanic and tectonic activity at the beginning of Member C's deposition, three lakes formed in various regions of the formation. At least Kabarsero Lake in Area Ia was freshwater, evidence of which can be found in the presence of diatoms and freshwater crabs. Kapkiamu Lake meanwhile was likely alkaline and inhabited by cichlids of the genus Oreochromis. Similar conditions can be observed in the modern-day Lake Magadi, home to Alcolapia grahami. The rhythmic nature of the shale and clay deposits of Member C indicate seasonally fluctuating climate conditions, further supported by the growth rings of fossil wood. The two lakes were separated by 8 kilometers, which is not unusual given similar occurrences of freshwater and alkaline lakes in the modern day Rift Valley. The area between the lakes was covered by vigorously growing plant life, which lead to the creation of paleosol. The third lake west of Kaption Volcano was also freshwater.

Member D shows increased channeling indicative of rejuvenation through freshwater, which suggests a return of fluvial conditions as present in Member B. Also like in Member B, ruminants are used to infer an open or lightly wooded grassland environment in Area Ia. In Area Ib, ostracods, fish and crabs are all found in marginal lacustrine deposits at Kalimale. This lake underwent varying water levels and frequently dried up.

One particular locality within the lower members (12.6 Ma) of the Ngorora Formation is interpreted to have been a submontaine to lowland rainforest environment preserved by the ash from a local volcanic eruption. The presence of mostly microphyllous (small sized, single veined) leaves and only one leptophyllous (long, slender) leaf indicate a moist to wet environment for the preserved forest habitat. Of the preserved plant fossils, 15% can be classified as herbs, 5% as herbs or shrubs, 12% lianas and 62% as shrubs or trees. Some bias towards herbaceous plants is present due to the preservation through ashfall and the preserved leaves of shrubs and trees are consistent with leaf fall that occurs in forests. The locality shows no signs of a present leaflitter, either due to decomposition following ashfall or due to the rapid decay of plant material in tropical, wet forest environments (in particular during the wet season, prior to increased leaf fall with the onset of the dry season).

Paleofauna

Molluscs

Annelids

Arthropods

Fish

Reptiles

Birds

Mammals

Afrotheres

Artiodactyles

Carnivorans

Perissodactyls

Primates

Rodents

Paleoflora

References

Geologic formations of Kenya
Miocene Africa
Shale formations
Fluvial deposits
Paleontology in Kenya
Lacustrine deposits